Cuspidaria is the scientific name of two genera of organisms and may refer to:

 Cuspidaria (bivalve), a mollusc genus in the family Cuspidariidae
 Cuspidaria (plant), a plant genus in the family Bignoniaceae